State Trunk Highway 84 (often called Highway 84, STH-84 or WIS 84) was a state highway in Washington County and Ozaukee counties.  The highway ran between Boltonville and Port Washington.

History
WIS 84 originally ran east–west between Boltonville and Port Washington (in Ozaukee County), via Fredonia. The road was turned over to the counties in two stages in the 1990s. The first stage removed the route between Port Washington and Fillmore, and in 1992, the remainder was turned back as Washington County Trunk Hwy H, but it is unclear when the signs were removed.

Major intersections

See also

References

External links

084
Transportation in Washington County, Wisconsin
Transportation in Ozaukee County, Wisconsin